Usipa (scientific name: Engraulicypris sardella) is a "small sardine-like fish that occurs in large shoals".  Because of its small size, it is commonly dried. Usipa is mostly eaten in Malawi and Mozambique along with nsima ugali. Dried usipa is sold at most markets in Malawi. In Malawi, Usipa is typically consumed with the bones in it due to their softness.

Usipa plays a significant role in the economic livelihood for many households at Lake Malawi that rely upon fishing for income. A great deal is not known about the species' biology.

References

Malawian_cuisine
Mozambican cuisine
Yao (East Africa)
Fish common names
Engraulicypris